Saskatchewan Drive is a river valley road on the south side of the North Saskatchewan River in Edmonton, Alberta.  It was formed on the banks of the river when the area was known as the City of Strathcona.  After the amalgamation with Edmonton, and as the grid streets expanded, Saskatchewan Drive was broken up, however most of it still remains, with portions being one-way streets.

Neighbourhoods
List of neighbourhoods Saskatchewan Drive and Scona Road runs through, in order from south to north:
Belgravia
Windsor Park
University of Alberta
Garneau
Strathcona

Major intersections
This is a list of major intersections, starting at the south end of Saskatchewan Drive.

See also 

 Transportation in Edmonton

References

Roads in Edmonton